Richard Whitehead may refer to:

Richard Whitehead (Hampshire MP) (1594–1663), Parliamentary colonel
Richard Whitehead (athlete) (born 1976), British Paralympic athlete
Richard G. Whitehead, American dental surgeon

See also
Richard Whitehead Young (1858–1919), U.S. Army officer and judge in the Philippines